Sardar Jalaloglu (born June 3, 1954) is an Azeri doctor and politician. He was born in the village of Cehri of Babek district of Nakhchivan. He went to school in Ordubad and finished secondary school in Baku. In 1997, he graduated from Azerbaijan State Medical Institute. After graduation, he worked 15 years as a doctor.

Political career
In 1985, he joined Azerbaijan National Movement. He was one of the initiators for establishing Azerbaijan National Movement and till 1991 was member of Nakhchivan National Movement’s governing body.
In 1991, he was one of the founders of Azerbaijan Democratic Party, was elected the general secretary of the Azerbaijan Democratic Party in 1994-96, from 1996 to 2005 first deputy chairman of the Party and from 2005 to 2007 deputy chairman of the Party.
He was arrested illegally in the events of 15–16 October 2003, was recognized as a political prisoner by a number of international organizations including European Union and the ECHR and finally was released in March, 2005.
On May 27, 2007 in the Ninth Congress of the ADP, he was elected the chairman of the Party.
Been nominated for 2008 Presidential election from ADP.
One of the founders of newspapers such as: Hurriyyet, Haray and Oyanish.
Author of hundreds of articles, book reviews about Globalization, Philosophy, Monographies in Ethnography, etc.
Sardar Jalaloglu been arrested 3 times for his outspoken speeches and political views.
Married, has 4 children.

Works
"Mahiyyət"
"Azadlığa məhkumuq"
"İnsanlar və adamlar"
"Türkəçarə"

References

1954 births
Living people
Sardar Jalaloglu
Sardar Jalaloglu
Leaders of political parties in Azerbaijan